The Gettysburg Address is a speech that U.S. President Abraham Lincoln delivered during the American Civil War at the dedication of the Soldiers' National Cemetery, now known as Gettysburg National Cemetery, in Gettysburg, Pennsylvania on the afternoon of November 19, 1863, four and a half months after the Union armies defeated Confederate forces in the Battle of Gettysburg, the Civil War's deadliest battle. It remains one of the best known speeches in American history.

Lincoln's carefully crafted but brief address, which was not even scheduled as the day's primary speech, came to be seen as one of the greatest and most influential statements on the American national purpose. In just 271 words, beginning with the now famous phrase "Four score and seven years ago,"‍ referring to the signing of the Declaration of Independence 87 years earlier, Lincoln described the U.S. as a nation "conceived in Liberty, and dedicated to the proposition that all men are created equal," and represented the Civil War as a test that would determine whether such a nation could endure. Lincoln extolled the sacrifices of those who died at Gettysburg in defense of those principles, and then urged that the nation ensure:

that these dead shall not have died in vain—that this nation, under God, shall have a new birth of freedom—and that government of the people, by the people, for the people, shall not perish from the earth.

Despite the prominent place of the speech in the history and popular culture of the United States, its exact wording is disputed. The five known manuscripts of the Gettysburg Address in Lincoln's hand differ in a number of details, and also differ from contemporary newspaper reprints of the speech. Nor is it precisely clear where, on the grounds of the Gettysburg cemetery, Lincoln delivered the address. A 2022 interpretation of photographs of the day, using 3D modeling software, has argued for a slightly different locationstraddling the current fence around Evergreen Cemetery.

Background 

Following the Battle of Gettysburg on July 1–3, 1863, the removal of the fallen Union soldiers from the Gettysburg Battlefield graves and their reburial in graves at the National Cemetery at Gettysburg began on October 17, though on the day of the ceremony, interment was less than half complete.

In inviting President Lincoln to the ceremonies, David Wills, of the committee for the November 19 Consecration of the National Cemetery at Gettysburg, wrote, "It is the desire that, after the Oration, you, as Chief Executive of the nation, formally set apart these grounds to their sacred use by a few appropriate remarks."

On the train trip from Washington, D.C. to Gettysburg on November 18, Lincoln was accompanied by three members of his Cabinet, William Seward, John Usher, and Montgomery Blair, several foreign officials, his secretary John Nicolay, and his assistant secretary, John Hay. During the trip, Lincoln remarked to Hay that he felt weak; on the morning of November 19, Lincoln mentioned to Nicolay that he was dizzy. Hay noted during the speech that Lincoln's face had "a ghastly color" and that he was "sad, mournful, almost haggard". After the speech, when Lincoln boarded the 6:30pm train to return to Washington, D.C., he was feverish and weak with a severe headache. A protracted illness followed, which included a vesicular rash; it was diagnosed as a mild case of smallpox. It is highly likely that Lincoln was in the prodromal period of smallpox as he delivered the Gettysburg Address.

After arriving in Gettysburg, which had become filled with large crowds, Lincoln spent the night in Wills's house.  A large crowd appeared at the house, singing and wanting Lincoln to make a speech.  Lincoln met the crowd, but did not have a speech prepared, and returned inside after saying a few extemporaneous words.  The crowd then continued to another house, where Secretary of State William Seward delivered a speech.  Later that night, Lincoln wrote and briefly met with Seward before going to bed at about midnight.

Program and Everett's "Gettysburg Oration"

The program organized for that day by Wills and his committee included:

While it is Lincoln's short speech that has gone down in history as one of the finest examples of English public oratory, it was Everett's oration that was slated to be the "Gettysburg address" that day. His now seldom-read oration was 13,607 words long and lasted two hours.

Lengthy dedication addresses like Everett's were common at cemeteries in this era. The tradition began in 1831 when Justice Joseph Story delivered the dedication address at Mount Auburn Cemetery in Cambridge, Massachusetts. Those addresses often linked cemeteries to the mission of Union.

Text 

Shortly after Everett's well-received remarks, Lincoln spoke for only a few minutes. With a "few appropriate remarks", he was able to summarize his view of the war in just ten sentences.

Despite the historical significance of Lincoln's speech, modern scholars disagree as to its exact wording, and contemporary transcriptions published in newspaper accounts of the event and even handwritten copies by Lincoln himself differ in their wording, punctuation, and structure. Of these versions, the Bliss version, written well after the speech as a favor for a friend, is viewed by many as the standard text. Its text differs, however, from the written versions prepared by Lincoln before and after his speech. It is the only version to which Lincoln affixed his signature, and the last he is known to have written.

Lincoln's sources 
In Lincoln at Gettysburg, Garry Wills notes the parallels between Lincoln's speech and Pericles's Funeral Oration during the Peloponnesian War as described by Thucydides. (James McPherson notes this connection in his review of Wills's book. Gore Vidal also draws attention to this link in a BBC documentary about oration.) Pericles' speech, like Lincoln's:
 Begins with an acknowledgment of revered predecessors: "I shall begin with our ancestors: it is both just and proper that they should have the honor of the first mention on an occasion like the present"
 Praises the uniqueness of the State's commitment to democracy: "If we look to the laws, they afford equal justice to all in their private differences"
 Honors the sacrifice of the slain, "Thus choosing to die resisting, rather than to live submitting, they fled only from dishonor, but met danger face to face"
 Exhorts the living to continue the struggle: "You, their survivors, must determine to have as unfaltering a resolution in the field, though you may pray that it may have a happier issue."
In contrast, writer Adam Gopnik, in The New Yorker, notes that while Everett's Oration was explicitly neoclassical, referring directly to Marathon and Pericles, "Lincoln's rhetoric is, instead, deliberately Biblical. (It is difficult to find a single obviously classical reference in any of his speeches.) Lincoln had mastered the sound of the King James Bible so completely that he could recast abstract issues of constitutional law in Biblical terms, making the proposition that Texas and New Hampshire should be forever bound by a single post office sound like something right out of Genesis."

Glenn LaFantasie, writing for the Journal of the Abraham Lincoln Association, also connected "four score and seven years" with Psalms 90:10, and referred to Lincoln's usage of the phrase "our fathers" as "mindful of the Lord's Prayer".  He also refers to Garry Wills's tracing of spiritual language in the address to the Gospel of Luke.  Philip B. Kunhardt Jr. suggests that Lincoln was inspired by the Book of Common Prayer.  A 1959 thesis by William J. Wolf suggested that the address had a central image of baptism, although LaFantasie believes that Wolf's position was likely an overstatement.

Wills observed Lincoln's usage of the imagery of birth, life, and death in reference to a nation "brought forth", "conceived", and that shall not "perish". Others, including Allen C. Guelzo, the director of Civil War Era studies at Gettysburg College in Pennsylvania, suggested that Lincoln's formulation "four score and seven" was an allusion to the King James Version of the Bible's , in which man's lifespan is given as "threescore years and ten; and if by reason of strength they be fourscore years".

"Government of the people, by the people, for the people"
Several theories have been advanced by Lincoln scholars to explain the provenance of Lincoln's famous phrase "government of the people, by the people, for the people". Despite many claims, there is no evidence that a similar phrase appears in the Prologue to John Wycliffe's 1384 English translation of the Bible.

In a discussion "A more probable origin of a famous Lincoln phrase", in a letter to The American Monthly Review of Reviews, Unitarian minister John White Chadwick points to William Herndon, Lincoln's law partner, who wrote in the 1888 work Abraham Lincoln: The True Story of A Great Life that he had brought to Lincoln some of the sermons of abolitionist minister Theodore Parker, of Massachusetts, and that Lincoln was moved by Parker's use of this idea:

Craig R. Smith, in "Criticism of Political Rhetoric and Disciplinary Integrity", suggested Lincoln's view of the government as expressed in the Gettysburg Address was influenced by the noted speech of Massachusetts Senator Daniel Webster, the "Second Reply to Hayne", in which Webster famously thundered "Liberty and Union, now and forever, one and inseparable!" Specifically, in this speech on January 26, 1830, before the United States Senate, Webster described the federal government as: "made for the people, made by the people, and answerable to the people", foreshadowing Lincoln's "government of the people, by the people, for the people". Webster also noted, "This government, Sir, is the independent offspring of the popular will. It is not the creature of State legislatures; nay, more, if the whole truth must be told, the people brought it into existence, established it, and have hitherto supported it, for the very purpose, amongst others, of imposing certain salutary restraints on State sovereignties."

Five manuscripts 

Each of the five known manuscript copies of the Gettysburg Address is named for the person who received it from Lincoln. Lincoln gave copies to his private secretaries, John Nicolay and John Hay. Both of these drafts were written around the time of his November 19 address, while the other three copies of the address, the Everett, Bancroft, and Bliss copies, were written by Lincoln for charitable purposes well after November 19. In part because Lincoln provided a title and signed and dated the Bliss copy, it has become the standard text of Lincoln's Gettysburg Address.

Nicolay and Hay were appointed custodians of Lincoln's papers by Lincoln's son Robert Todd Lincoln in 1874. After appearing in facsimile in an article written by John Nicolay in 1894, the Nicolay copy was presumably among the papers passed to Hay by Nicolay's daughter Helen upon Nicolay's death in 1901. Robert Lincoln began a search for the original copy in 1908, which resulted in the discovery of a handwritten copy of the Gettysburg Address among the bound papers of John Hay—a copy now known as the "Hay copy" or "Hay draft".

The Hay draft differed from the version of the Gettysburg Address published by John Nicolay in 1894 in a number of significant ways: it was written on a different type of paper, had a different number of words per line and number of lines, and contained editorial revisions in Lincoln's hand.

Both the Hay and Nicolay copies of the Address are within the Library of Congress, encased in specially designed, temperature-controlled, sealed containers with argon gas in order to protect the documents from oxidation and continued deterioration.

Nicolay copy 
The Nicolay copy is often called the "first draft" because it is believed to be the earliest copy that exists. Scholars disagree over whether the Nicolay copy was actually the reading copy Lincoln held at Gettysburg on November 19. In an 1894 article that included a facsimile of this copy, Nicolay, who had become the custodian of Lincoln's papers, wrote that Lincoln had brought to Gettysburg the first part of the speech written in ink on Executive Mansion stationery, and that he had written the second page in pencil on lined paper before the dedication on November 19. Matching folds are still evident on the two pages, suggesting it could be the copy that eyewitnesses say Lincoln took from his coat pocket and read at the ceremony. Others believe that the delivery text has been lost, because some of the words and phrases of the Nicolay copy do not match contemporary transcriptions of Lincoln's original speech. The words "under God", for example, are missing in this copy from the phrase "that this nation shall have a new birth of freedom  ..." In order for the Nicolay draft to have been the reading copy, either the contemporary transcriptions were inaccurate, or Lincoln would have had to depart from his written text in several instances. This copy of the Gettysburg Address apparently remained in John Nicolay's possession until his death in 1901, when it passed to his friend and colleague John Hay. It used to be on display as part of the American Treasures exhibition of the Library of Congress in Washington, D.C.

Hay copy 

The existence of the Hay copy was first announced to the public in 1906, after the search for the "original manuscript" of the Address among the papers of John Hay brought it to light. Significantly, it differs somewhat from the manuscript of the Address described by John Nicolay in his article, and contains numerous omissions and inserts in Lincoln's own hand, including omissions critical to the basic meaning of the sentence, not simply words that would be added by Lincoln to strengthen or clarify their meaning. In this copy, as in the Nicolay copy, the words "under God" are not present.

This version has been described as "the most inexplicable" of the drafts and is sometimes referred to as the "second draft". The "Hay copy" was made either on the morning of the delivery of the Address, or shortly after Lincoln's return to Washington. Those who believe that it was completed on the morning of his address point to the fact that it contains certain phrases that are not in the first draft but are in the reports of the address as delivered and in subsequent copies made by Lincoln. It is probable, they conclude, that, as stated in the explanatory note accompanying the original copies of the first and second drafts in the Library of Congress, Lincoln held this second draft when he delivered the address. Lincoln eventually gave this copy to Hay, whose descendants donated both it and the Nicolay copy to the Library of Congress in 1916.

Everett copy 
The Everett copy, also known as the "Everett-Keyes copy", was sent by President Lincoln to Edward Everett in early 1864, at Everett's request. Everett was collecting the speeches at the Gettysburg dedication into one bound volume to sell for the benefit of stricken soldiers at New York's Sanitary Commission Fair. The draft Lincoln sent became the third autograph copy, and is now in the possession of the Illinois State Historical Library in Springfield, Illinois, where it is displayed in the Treasures Gallery of the Abraham Lincoln Presidential Library and Museum.

Bancroft copy 
The Bancroft copy of the Gettysburg Address was written out by President Lincoln in February 1864 at the request of George Bancroft, the famed historian and former Secretary of the Navy, whose comprehensive ten-volume History of the United States later led him to be known as the "father of American History". Bancroft planned to include this copy in Autograph Leaves of Our Country's Authors, which he planned to sell at a Soldiers' and Sailors' Sanitary Fair in Baltimore. As this fourth copy was written on both sides of the paper, it proved unusable for this purpose, and Bancroft was allowed to keep it. This manuscript is the only one accompanied both by a letter from Lincoln transmitting the manuscript and by the original envelope addressed and franked by Lincoln. This copy remained in the Bancroft family for many years, was sold to various dealers and purchased by Nicholas and Marguerite Lilly Noyes, who donated the manuscript to Cornell University in 1949. It is now held by the Division of Rare and Manuscript Collections in the Carl A. Kroch Library at Cornell. It is the only one of the five copies to be privately owned.

Bliss copy 

Discovering that his fourth written copy could not be used, Lincoln then wrote a fifth draft, which was accepted for the purpose requested. The Bliss copy, named for Colonel Alexander Bliss, Bancroft's stepson and publisher of Autograph Leaves, is the only draft to which Lincoln affixed his signature. Lincoln is not known to have made any further copies of the Gettysburg Address. Because of the apparent care in its preparation, and in part, because Lincoln provided a title and signed and dated this copy, it has become the standard version of the address and the source for most facsimile reproductions of Lincoln's Gettysburg Address. It is the version that is inscribed on the South wall of the Lincoln Memorial.

This draft is now displayed in the Lincoln Room of the White House, a gift of Oscar B. Cintas, former Cuban Ambassador to the United States. Cintas, a wealthy collector of art and manuscripts, purchased the Bliss copy at a public auction in 1949 for $54,000 ($ as of ), at that time the highest price ever paid for a document at public auction. Cintas' properties were claimed by the Castro government after the Cuban Revolution in 1959, but Cintas, who died in 1957, willed the Gettysburg Address to the American people, provided it would be kept at the White House, where it was transferred in 1959.

Garry Wills concluded the Bliss copy "is stylistically preferable to others in one significant way: Lincoln removed 'here' from 'that cause for which they (here) gave  ... ' The seventh 'here' is in all other versions of the speech." Wills noted the fact that Lincoln "was still making such improvements", suggesting Lincoln was more concerned with a perfected text than with an 'original' one.

From November 21, 2008, to January 1, 2009, the Albert H. Small Documents Gallery at the Smithsonian Institution National Museum of American History hosted a limited public viewing of the Bliss copy, with the support of then-First Lady Laura Bush. The Museum also launched an online exhibition and interactive gallery to enable visitors to look more closely at the document.

Associated Press report 
Another contemporary source of the text is the Associated Press dispatch, transcribed from the shorthand notes taken by reporter Joseph L. Gilbert. It also differs from the drafted text in a number of minor ways.

Contemporary sources and reaction 

Eyewitness reports vary as to their view of Lincoln's performance. In 1931, the printed recollections of 87-year-old Mrs. Sarah A. Cooke Myers, who was 19 when she attended the ceremony, suggest a dignified silence followed Lincoln's speech: "I was close to the President and heard all of the Address, but it seemed short. Then there was an impressive silence like our Menallen Friends Meeting. There was no applause when he stopped speaking." According to historian Shelby Foote, after Lincoln's presentation, the applause was delayed, scattered, and "barely polite". In contrast, Pennsylvania Governor Andrew Gregg Curtin maintained, "He pronounced that speech in a voice that all the multitude heard. The crowd was hushed into silence because the President stood before them  ... It was so Impressive! It was the common remark of everybody. Such a speech, as they said it was!"

In an oft-repeated legend, Lincoln is said to have turned to his bodyguard Ward Hill Lamon and remarked that his speech, like a bad plow, "won't scour". According to Garry Wills, this statement has no basis in fact and largely originates from the unreliable recollections of Lamon. In Garry Wills's view, " had done what he wanted to do ".

In a letter to Lincoln written the following day, Everett praised the President for his eloquent and concise speech, saying, "I should be glad if I could flatter myself that I came as near to the central idea of the occasion, in two hours, as you did in two minutes." Lincoln replied that he was glad to know the speech was not a "total failure".

Other public reaction to the speech was divided along partisan lines. The Democratic-leaning Chicago Times observed, "The cheek of every American must tingle with shame as he reads the silly, flat and dishwatery utterances of the man who has to be pointed out to intelligent foreigners as the President of the United States." In contrast, the Republican-leaning The New York Times was complimentary and printed the speech. In Massachusetts, the Springfield Republican also printed the entire speech, calling it "a perfect gem" that was "deep in feeling, compact in thought and expression, and tasteful and elegant in every word and comma". The Republican predicted that Lincoln's brief remarks would "repay further study as the model speech". In 2013, on the sesquicentennial of the address, The Patriot-News of Harrisburg, Pennsylvania, formerly the Patriot & Union, retracted its original reaction ("silly remarks" deserving "the veil of oblivion") stating: "Seven score and ten years ago, the forefathers of this media institution brought forth to its audience a judgment so flawed, so tainted by hubris, so lacking in the perspective history would bring, that it cannot remain unaddressed in our archives.  ... the Patriot & Union failed to recognize [the speech's] momentous importance, timeless eloquence, and lasting significance. The Patriot-News regrets the error."

Foreign newspapers also criticized Lincoln's remarks. The Times of London commented: "The ceremony [at Gettysburg] was rendered ludicrous by some of the luckless sallies of that poor President Lincoln."

Congressman Joseph A. Goulden, then an eighteen-year-old school teacher, was present and heard the speech. He served in the United States Marine Corps during the war, and later had a successful career in insurance in Pennsylvania and New York City before entering Congress as a Democrat. In his later life, Goulden was often asked about the speech, since the passage of time made him one of a dwindling number of individuals who had been present for it. He commented on the event and Lincoln's speech in favorable terms, naming Lincoln's address as one of the inspirations for him to enter military service. Goulden's recollections included remarks to the House of Representatives in 1914.

Audio recollections 
William R. Rathvon is the only known eyewitness of both Lincoln's arrival at Gettysburg and the address itself to have left an audio recording of his recollections. One year before his death in 1939, Rathvon's reminiscences were recorded on February 12, 1938, at the Boston studios of radio station WRUL, including his reading the address, itself, and a 78 RPM record was pressed. The title of the 78 record was "I Heard Lincoln That Day – William R. Rathvon, TR Productions". A copy wound up at National Public Radio (NPR) during a "Quest for Sound" project in 1999.

Like most people who came to Gettysburg, the Rathvon family was aware that Lincoln was going to make some remarks. The family went to the town square where the procession was to form to go out to the cemetery that had not been completed yet. At the head of the procession rode Lincoln on a gray horse preceded by a military band that was the first the young boy had ever seen. Rathvon describes Lincoln as so tall and with such long legs that they went almost to the ground; he also mentions the long eloquent speech given by Edward Everett of Massachusetts whom Rathvon accurately described as the "most finished orator of the day". Rathvon then goes on to describe how Lincoln stepped forward and "with a manner serious almost to sadness, gave his brief address".  During the delivery, along with some other boys, young Rathvon wiggled his way forward through the crowd until he stood within  of Lincoln and looked up into what he described as his "serious face". Rathvon recalls candidly that, although he listened "intently to every word the president uttered and heard it clearly", he explains, "boylike, I could not recall any of it afterwards". But he explains that if anyone said anything disparaging about "honest Abe", there would have been a "junior battle of Gettysburg". In the recording Rathvon speaks of Lincoln's speech allegorically "echoing through the hills".

Photographs 
The only known and confirmed photograph of Lincoln at Gettysburg, taken by photographer David Bachrach, was identified in the Mathew Brady collection of photographic plates in the National Archives and Records Administration in 1952. While Lincoln's speech was short and may have precluded multiple pictures of him while speaking, he and the other dignitaries sat for hours during the rest of the program. Given the length of Everett's speech and the length of time it took for 19th-century photographers to get "set up" before taking a picture, it is quite plausible that the photographers were ill-prepared for the brevity of Lincoln's remarks.

Usage of "under God" 
The words "under God" do not appear in the Nicolay and Hay drafts but are included in the three later copies (Everett, Bancroft, and Bliss). Accordingly, some skeptics maintain that Lincoln did not utter the words "under God" at Gettysburg. However, at least three reporters telegraphed the text of Lincoln's speech on the day the Address was given with the words "under God" included. Historian William E. Barton argues that:

The reporters present included Joseph Gilbert, from the Associated Press; Charles Hale, from the Boston Advertiser; John R. Young (who later became the Librarian of Congress), from the Philadelphia Press; and reporters from the Cincinnati Commercial, New York Tribune, and The New York Times. Charles Hale "had notebook and pencil in hand, [and] took down the slow-spoken words of the President". "He took down what he declared was the exact language of Lincoln's address, and his declaration was as good as the oath of a court stenographer. His associates confirmed his testimony, which was received, as it deserved to be, at its face value." One explanation is that Lincoln deviated from his prepared text and inserted the phrase when he spoke. Ronald C. White, visiting professor of history at the University of California, Los Angeles and professor of American religious history emeritus at the San Francisco Theological Seminary, wrote in this context of Lincoln's insertion and usage of "under God":

It was an uncharacteristically spontaneous revision for a speaker who did not trust extemporaneous speech. Lincoln had added impromptu words in several earlier speeches, but always offered a subsequent apology for the change. In this instance, he did not. And Lincoln included "under God" in all three copies of the address he prepared at later dates. "Under God" pointed backward and forward: back to "this nation", which drew its breath from both political and religious sources, but also forward to a "new birth". Lincoln had come to see the Civil War as a ritual of purification. The old Union had to die. The old man had to die. Death became a transition to a new Union and a new humanity.

The phrase "under God" was used frequently in works published before 1860, usually with the meaning "with God's help".

Platform location

Outside of either entrance to the National Cemetery, twin historical markers read:

Nearby, Nov. 19, 1863, in dedicating the National Cemetery, Abraham Lincoln gave the address which he had written in Washington and revised after his arrival at Gettysburg the evening of November 18.

Directly inside the Taneytown Road entrance are the Lincoln Address Memorial and Rostrum, which has hosted speeches by five U.S. Presidents. Lincoln was not one of them, and a small metal sign near the speech memorial stirs controversy by stating:

The Address was delivered about 300 yards from this spot along the upper Cemetery drive. The site is now marked by the Soldiers' National Monument.

Holding title as the Traditional Site, the validity of the Soldiers' National Monument has been challenged by platform occupants (in the distant past) and by (relatively recent) photographic analyses. Based upon a pair of photographic analyses, the Gettysburg National Military Park (G.N.M.P.) has placed a marker (near 39°49.199′N 77°13.840′W) which states, "The location [of the platform] was never marked, but is believed to be in Evergreen Cemetery, on the other side of the iron fence."

The observer of this newer marker stands facing the fence which separates the two adjacent cemeteries (one public and one private). Another heavy endorsement of the Traditional Site, this one in bronze and placed by Lincoln's native Commonwealth, stands nearby.

Absent an original and enduring marker, the location of the platform is in the hands of rhetoricians and scholars. The Superintendent of Evergreen Cemetery, Brian Kennell, emphatically endorses the findings of William Frassanito's photographic analysis.

Pre-modern

Colonel W. Yates Selleck was a marshal in the parade on Consecration Day and was seated on the platform when Lincoln made the address. Selleck marked a map with the position of the platform and described it as " almost due north of Soldiers' National Monument,  from a point in the outer circle of lots where [the] Michigan and New York [burial sections] are separated by a path". A location which approximates this description is 39°49.243′N, 77°13.869′W.

As pointed out in 1973 by retired park historian Frederick Tilberg, the Selleck Site is  lower than the crest of Cemetery Hill, and only the crest presents a panoramic view of the battlefield. A spectacular view from the location of the speech was noted by many eyewitnesses, is consistent with the Traditional Site at the Soldiers' National Monument (and other sites on the crest) but is inconsistent with the Selleck Site.

The Kentucky Memorial, erected in 1975, is directly adjacent to the Soldiers' National Monument, and states, "Kentucky honors her son, Abraham Lincoln, who delivered his immortal address at the site now marked by the soldiers' monument." With its position at the center of the concentric rings of soldiers' graves and the continuing endorsement of Lincoln's native state the Soldiers' National Monument persists as a credible location for the speech.

Writing a physical description of the layout for the Gettysburg National Cemetery under construction in November 1863, the correspondent from the Cincinnati Daily Commercial described the dividing lines between the state grave plots as "the radii of a common center, where a flag pole is now raised, but where it is proposed to erect a national monument". With the inclusion of this quotation Tilberg inadvertently verifies a central principle of future photographic analyses—a flagpole, rather than the speakers' platform, occupied the central point of the soldiers' graves. In fact, the precision of the photo-analyses relies upon the coincidence of position between this temporary flag pole and the future monument.

Confusing to today's tourist, the Kentucky Memorial is contradicted by a newer marker which was erected nearby by the Gettysburg National Military Park and locates the speakers' platform inside Evergreen Cemetery. Similarly, outdated National Park Service documents which pinpoint the location at the Soldiers' National Monument have not been systematically revised since the placement of the newer marker. Miscellaneous web pages perpetuate the Traditional Site.

Photo analysis

2-D and optical stereoscopy

In 1982, Senior Park Historian Kathleen Georg Harrison first analyzed photographs and proposed a location in Evergreen Cemetery but has not published her analysis. Speaking for Harrison without revealing details, two sources characterize her proposed location as "on or near [the] Brown family vault" in Evergreen Cemetery.

William A. Frassanito, a former military intelligence analyst, documented a comprehensive photographic analysis in 1995, and it associates the location of the platform with the position of specific modern headstones in Evergreen Cemetery. According to Frassanito, the extant graves of Israel Yount (died 1892)(), John Koch (died 1913)(), and George E. Kitzmiller (died 1874)() are among those which occupy the location of the 1863 speaker's stand.

3D Photo-rendering and -animation

Over the course of many years, an Assistant Professor of New Media at the University of North Carolina at Asheville, Christopher Oakley, and his students have labored to produce and relentlessly perfect "a lifelike virtual 3-D re-creation of Lincoln delivering the Gettysburg Address" as part of the Virtual Lincoln Project.  One result was revealed when “Placing the Platform: Using 3D Technology to Pinpoint Lincoln at Gettysburg” was presented on November 18, 2022, at the Lincoln Forum XXVII in Gettysburg.

As a starting point, the project modeled the topography around Cemetery Hill, the Gatehouse at Evergreen Cemetery and the documented positions of nonextant objects which appear in photographs (the poplar tree, the flag pole and the Duttera House among them) using 3-D animation software Maya. Next, the platform and its occupants were modeled. Finally, the approximate positions of the cameras were placed into the 3-D environment, and the overall model was iteratively refined. By reproducing the appearance of the four known photographs, taken distantly from one another in 1863, Lincoln and the platform have been placed in virtual reality.

Oakley's model shows the platform straddling the iron fence between the Soldiers' National Cemetery and Evergreen Cemetery. It increases the size of the platform and changes its shape from rectangular, as previous researchers have maintained, to trapezoidal. Most significantly, the speaker's position occupies a portion of the platform over the grounds of the Soldiers' National Cemetery.

William Frassanito's analysis is based upon two of the four photographic perspectives which were employed by Oakley to validate his 3D model. Frassanito assesses one of his sources by stating, "This view [by Weaver] was probably not taken from the second-story window of the gatehouse itself." Via enlargement of a Gardner photograph (taken from the opposite direction), John J. Richter may have identified a photographer with a camera in this exact window, thereby weakening the contribution of the Weaver photograph to Frassanito's conclusions. Oakley's proprietary 3D model utilizes the position of Weaver's camera as suggested by Richter.

Resolution

The GNMP marker, Wills's interpretation of Harrison's analysis, the Frassanito analysis, and the Oakley analysis concur that the platform was located entirely or mostly in private Evergreen Cemetery, rather than public Soldiers' National Cemetery. The National Park Service's National Cemetery Walking Tour brochure is one NPS document which agrees:
The Soldiers' National Monument, long misidentified as the spot from which Lincoln spoke, honors the fallen soldiers. [The location of the speech] was actually on the crown of this hill, a short distance on the other side of the iron fence and inside the Evergreen Cemetery, where President Lincoln delivered the Gettysburg Address to a crowd of some 15,000 people.

The locations determined by the Harrison/Wills, Frassanito, and Oakley analyses differ by approximately 40 yards. Frassanito has documented 1) his own conclusion, 2) his own methods and 3) a refutation of the Harrison site, but neither the GNMP nor Harrison has provided any documentation. Oakley's interpretation was only made public in 2022 and is still under review. Each of the four points to a location in Evergreen Cemetery, as do modern NPS publications.

Although Lincoln dedicated the Gettysburg National Cemetery, the monument at the Cemetery's center actually has nothing to do with Lincoln or his famous speech. Intended to symbolize Columbia paying tribute to her fallen sons, its appreciation has been commandeered by the thirst for a tidy home for the speech. Freeing the Cemetery and Monument to serve their original purpose, honoring of Union departed, is as unlikely as a resolution to the location controversy and the erection of a public monument to the speech in the exclusively private Evergreen Cemetery.

Legacy 

The importance of the Gettysburg Address in the history of the United States is underscored by its enduring presence in American culture. In addition to its prominent place carved into a stone cella on the south wall of the Lincoln Memorial in Washington, D.C., the Gettysburg Address is frequently referred to in works of popular culture, with the implicit expectation that contemporary audiences will be familiar with Lincoln's words.

In the many generations that have passed since the Address, it has remained among the most famous speeches in American history and is often taught in classes about history or civics. Lincoln's Gettysburg Address is itself referenced in another of those famed orations, Martin Luther King Jr.'s "I Have a Dream" speech. Standing on the steps of the Lincoln Memorial in August 1963, King began with a reference, by the style of his opening phrase, to President Lincoln and his enduring words: "Five score years ago, a great American, in whose symbolic shadow we stand today, signed the Emancipation Proclamation. This momentous decree came as a great beacon light of hope to millions of Negro slaves who had been seared in the flames of withering injustice."

Phrases from the Address are often used or referenced in other works. The current Constitution of France states that the principle of the French Republic is "gouvernement du peuple, par le peuple et pour le peuple ("government of the people, by the people, and for the people"), a literal translation of Lincoln's words. Sun Yat-Sen's "Three Principles of the People" as well as the preamble for the 1947 Constitution of Japan were also inspired from that phrase. The aircraft carrier  has as its ship's motto the phrase "shall not perish".

U.S. Senator Charles Sumner of Massachusetts wrote of the address and its enduring presence in American culture after Lincoln's assassination in April 1865: "That speech, uttered at the field of Gettysburg  ... and now sanctified by the martyrdom of its author, is a monumental act. In the modesty of his nature he said 'the world will little note, nor long remember what we say here; but it can never forget what they did here.' He was mistaken. The world at once noted what he said, and will never cease to remember it."

In January 1961 John F. Kennedy tasked his speech writer Ted Sorensen to study the Gettysburg Address in order to help him with his own inaugural address. Sorensen drew many lessons from the Gettysburg Address which according to Sorensen included rhetoric devices used by many speech writers like alliterations, rhymes, repetitions as well as contrast and balance.

U.S. President John F. Kennedy stated in July 1963 about the battle and Lincoln's speech: "Five score years ago the ground on which we here stand shuddered under the clash of arms and was consecrated for all time by the blood of American manhood. Abraham Lincoln, in dedicating this great battlefield, has expressed, in words too eloquent for paraphrase or summary, why this sacrifice was necessary."

In 2015, the Abraham Lincoln Presidential Library Foundation compiled Gettysburg Replies: The World Responds to Abraham Lincoln's Gettysburg Address.  The work challenges leaders to craft 272 word responses to celebrate Lincoln, the Gettysburg Address, or a related topic.
One of the replies was by astrophysicist Neil deGrasse Tyson in which he made the point that one of Lincoln's greatest legacies was establishing, in the same year of the Gettysburg Address, the National Academy of Sciences, which had the longterm effect of "setting our Nation on a course of scientifically enlightened governance, without which we all may perish from this Earth".

Envelope and other myths
A common American myth about the Gettysburg Address is that Lincoln quickly wrote the speech on the back of an envelope while on the train. This widely held misunderstanding may have originated with a popular book, The Perfect Tribute, by Mary Raymond Shipman Andrews (1906), which was assigned reading for generations of schoolchildren, sold 600,000 copies when published as a standalone volume, and was twice adapted for film.

Other lesser-known claims include Harriet Beecher Stowe's assertion that Lincoln had composed the address "in only a few moments," and that of industrialist Andrew Carnegie, who claimed to have personally supplied Lincoln with a pen.

Popular culture
A Lincoln Portrait is a classical orchestral work written by the American composer Aaron Copland in which the closing phrases of the Gettysburg address are intoned at the conclusion of the narrated Lincoln quotations which lead to the orchestral closing crescendo. The work involves a full orchestra, with particular emphasis on the brass section at climactic moments. The work is narrated with the reading of excerpts of Abraham Lincoln's great documents, including the Gettysburg Address. The intoned reading from the Address uses only the last two sentences starting with the words, "That from these honored dead...".

See also 
 Consecration of the National Cemetery at Gettysburg

References 
Informational notes

 The Gettysburg Address: Nicolay copy, page 1 (jpg), page 2 (jpg). The Library of Congress.
  The Gettysburg Address: Hay copy, page 1 (jpg), page 2 (jpg). The Library of Congress.
  Everett copy (jpg). virtualgettsyburg.com. Retrieved from internet archive 2007-06-14 version on 2007-12-10.
  Bancroft copy cover letter  (pic), Bancroft copy, page 1 (pic), page 2  (pic). Cornell University Library. Retrieved on 2007-12-11.
  Bliss copy, page 1 (jpg), page 2 (jpg), page 3 (jpg). Illinois Historic Preservation Agency. Retrieved on 2007-12-11.

 Citations

 Bibliography 

 
 Boritt, Gabor (2006). The Gettysburg Gospel: The Lincoln Speech That Nobody Knows Simon & Schuster. 432 pp. .
 Busey, John W., and Martin, David G. (2005). Regimental Strengths and Losses at Gettysburg, 4th Ed., Longstreet House, .
 Frassanito, William A. (1995). Early Photography at Gettysburg. Gettysburg, PA: Thomas Publications. .
 Gramm, Kent (2001). November: Lincoln's Elegy at Gettysburg. Bloomington: Indiana University Press. .
 
 
 Kunhardt, Philip B., Jr. (1983). A New Birth of Freedom: Lincoln at Gettysburg. Little Brown & Co. 263 pp. .
 
 
 
 
 
 
 Reid, Ronald F. "Newspaper Responses to the Gettysburg Addresses". Quarterly Journal of Speech 1967 53(1): 50–60. .
 
 Sauers, Richard A. (2000). "Battle of Gettysburg". In Encyclopedia of the American Civil War: A Political, Social, and Military History. Heidler, David S., and Heidler, Jeanne T., eds. W.W. Norton & Company. .
 Schaub, Diana (2021). His Greatest Speeches: How Lincoln Moved the Nation. New York: St. Martin's Press. .
 Schwartz, Barry. "The new Gettysburg Address: fusing history and memory." Poetics 33.1 (2005): 63-79. online
 Schwartz, Barry. "Rereading the Gettysburg address: Social change and collective memory." Qualitative Sociology 19.3 (1996): 395-422. online
 
 
 
 Wieck, Carl F. (2002). Lincoln's Quest for Equality: The Road to Gettysburg. Northern Illinois University Press. 224 pp.

Primary sources
 Abraham Lincoln Presidential Library Foundation, ed. (2015). Gettysburg Replies: The World Responds to Abraham Lincoln's Gettysburg Address,

External links 

 Library of Congress, Gettysburg Address exhibit
 Gettysburg National Military Park (GNMP) Gettysburg Historical Handbook 
 Online Lincoln Coloring Book for Teachers and Students
 Cornell University Library exhibit on Contemporary newspaper reactions.
 Abraham Lincoln: A Resource Guide from the Library of Congress
 Gettysburg Address read by Sam Waterston, Matthew Broderick, Ken Burns, David McCullough, Stephen Lang, Paul W. Bucha, etc. Music by John Williams.
 Gettysburg Address audio performances by Jeff Daniels, Jim Getty, Johnny Cash, Colin Powell, Sam Waterston, and W. F. Hooley from AmericanRhetoric.com
 The Gettysburg Address An online exhibition from the National Museum of American History, Smithsonian Institution
 

1863 in American politics
1863 in Pennsylvania
1863 speeches
American Civil War documents
Gettysburg, Pennsylvania
November 1863 events
Pennsylvania in the American Civil War
Politics of the American Civil War
Presidency of Abraham Lincoln
Speeches by Abraham Lincoln
United States documents